Human is the fifth  studio album by Canadian rock band Three Days Grace. The album was released on March 31, 2015 through RCA Records. This is the group's first album without original lead singer Adam Gontier, and the first with My Darkest Days lead singer Matt Walst. The group went on the "Human Tour" in support of the album.

Singles
On April 1, 2014, the band released "Painkiller" on iTunes. On April 8, 2014, the song was released to US rock radio stations. Two months later, it reached No. 1 on the Billboard Mainstream Rock chart. The second single, "I Am Machine", released in September 2014, reached No. 1 on the same chart. On March 23, 2015, "Human Race" was released as the third single. On September 15, 2015, "Fallen Angel" was released as the fourth single.

Reception

Human received mixed reviews upon release. The album debuted at number 2 on the Canadian Albums Chart, selling 6,700 copies in its first week.

The album peaked at number 16 on the Billboard 200 and sold 18,000 copies first week. As of January 8, 2016, the album has sold 121,000 copies in the US.

Heather Allen at Mind Equals Blown stated "It's always worrisome when a singer gets replaced because the band that you've come to know and love could easily do a complete musical 180." MusicReviewRadar stated "the departure of the iconic Adam Gontier could have forced the band’s loss of identity and direction but Matt Walst managed to fill in Adam’s spot without becoming a complete replica" and that "the album was a good surprise [...] well balanced between soft and good-old Three Days Grace-style tracks".

The album earned a nomination for "Rock Album of the Year" at the 2015 Loudwire Music Awards, though ultimately lost to Dark Before Dawn by Breaking Benjamin.

Track listing

Personnel

Three Days Grace
Matt Walst – lead vocals
Barry Stock – guitar
Brad Walst – bass
Neil Sanderson – drums, backing vocals

Additional musicians
Additional keyboards, synth and programming by Dani Rosenoer
Additional composers: Ted Bruner (3), Joey Moi (3), Mark Holman (7), Christopher Millar (3), Doug Oliver (2), Johnny Andrews (2, 6), Gavin Brown (1–12), Casey Marshall (10) and Marti Frederiksen (7)

Production
Produced by Gavin Brown
Engineered by Lenny DeRose
Mixed by Nick Raskulinecz (tracks: 1, 4, 5, 7, 8, 9, 10, 11, 12), Chris Lord-Alge (tracks: 2, 3, 6), Keith Armstrong and Nik Karpen
Mastered by Joe LaPorta
Studio assistants: Alex Krotz, Nathan Yarbourgh, Dim-E Krnjaic, Kevin O'Leary and Trevor Anderson
Editing and Pro Tools by Dave Mohacsi and Alastair Sims
A&R by David Wolter

Artwork
Creative director: Erwin Gorostiza
Art direction by Chris Feldmann and Three Days Grace
Design by Chris Feldmann
Photo by Michael Muller
Illustrations by Matthew Curry

Charts

Weekly charts

Year-end charts

Single charts

Certifications

References

2015 albums
Three Days Grace albums
RCA Records albums
Albums recorded at Noble Street Studios